The 2016–17 Bayer 04 Leverkusen season was the 113th season in the club's football history.

Players

Squad

Transfers

In

Out

Friendly matches

Competitions

Overview

Bundesliga

League table

Results summary

Results by round

Matches

DFB-Pokal

UEFA Champions League

Group stage

Knockout phase

Round of 16

Statistics

Appearances and goals

|-
! colspan=14 style=background:#dcdcdc; text-align:center| Goalkeepers

|-
! colspan=14 style=background:#dcdcdc; text-align:center| Defenders

|-
! colspan=14 style=background:#dcdcdc; text-align:center| Midfielders

|-
! colspan=14 style=background:#dcdcdc; text-align:center| Forwards

|-
! colspan=14 style=background:#dcdcdc; text-align:center| Players transferred out during the season

Goalscorers

Last updated: 20 May 2017

Clean sheets

Last updated: 15 April 2017

Disciplinary record

Last updated: 20 May 2017

References

Bayer 04 Leverkusen seasons
Bayer 04 Leverkusen
Bayer Leverkusen